Park Yun-a (born October 8, 1994), better known as Yoyomi, is a South Korean trot singer-songwriter and actress.

Early life 
Park was born on October 8, 1994 in Cheongju, North Chungcheong Province, South Korea. She is a graduate of Cheongju Girls' High School. 

As a child, she became interested in trot music from her father, who is a trot singer, and from hearing veteran singer Haeeunlee on the radio. In 2005, Park won the grand prize in the KBS Open Children's Song World competition.

Career 
Park released her first single, "Sorry Sorry," on July 23, 2013, using the stage name Yun-A, but the song was not successful.

She made her debut as Yoyomi on February 23, 2018, with the single album First Story, featuring the title track "Who's That Guy". 

She is said to be'Happy-Virus, Singing Fairy, Yomi yomi Yoyomi'. Her main genre is trot, but she sings various genres of songs such as ballad, dance, R&B, Rock, and POP. Her nickname is referred to as 'Little Haeeunlee()', 'IU of highway()', 'Joong-Tong-Lyeong(The president of the Middle Ages)()'.

She is also a trot(PopTrot)  singer-songwriter and wrote/composed her own songs <Please hold me tight> <How much more should I cry> < If You Love Me> < I Wanna Know Your Feeling>. 
Since 2018, She is active in various fields such as broadcasting various show programs, entertainment programs, advertising models, commercials, dramas, movies, MCs, and Internet real-time broadcasting.

She became a new star in the entertainment field through her YouTube channel. She is dedicated to the operation of the YouTube channel ' – YOYOMI', and is posting various genres such as dance, ballad, R&B, POP, as well as trot as cover songs.

Participated in TV Chosun 'Miss Trot Tomorrow'(). She also appeared on the KBS 1TV 'Golden Oldies()' as an invited singer.

Entertainment activities 

 In 2018, she started posting her own song on YouTube at the recommendation of the agency's representative (Ahn Jeong-mo).  On December 31, 2018, Yoyomi's favorite singer Haeeunlee'()s <The 3rd Hangang Bridge> was followed by a cover of Haeeunlee()'s songs one by one, and then rapidly spread through social media. In fact, Yoyomi sang Haeeunlee()'s song well before uploading Haeeunlee()'s song as a cover song. She made a pledge to release a new song every month, and in fact, after the release of his single album 《Second Story》 in October of the same year (2018), he releases the music every month. At the beginning of her debut, she took a drum lesson from'resurrection' drummer Chae Je-min.   She emerged like a morning star and became a hot topic in a short period of time through YouTube collaboration with the KBS Cheongju General Bureau.
 She is devoted to the activities of the YouTube channel '요요미 – YOYOMI'. Not only trot, but also dance, ballad, R&B, POP, and other genres are uploaded as cover songs. The cover song video is mainly produced when the schedule is free, and it is said to be produced in just a few hours.
 On August 8, 2018, he appeared on KBS 1TV's 《Morning Ground》() national story contest < Dream Stage>. For the 32nd year (at the time of 2018), he sang < Sweet Night> to free the hans of his father Park Si-won (Park Hae-gwan), an unknown singer.
 'Miss Trot Tomorrow'() appearance: She participated in the TV Chosun audition program 'Miss Trot Tomorrow', which started in February 2019.
 On May 17, 2019, SBI Savings Bank CF sang < Wage Flows>(), < Eternal Savings>() on October 25, < I Love Banking on Saturday>(), and < You Will Collect>() on November 1. After that, the popularity rose.
 On June 3, 2019, at the 'Incheon Ilbo TV Invitational'(), she said,'I read all the comments on YouTube in detail.' Among them, he introduced comments saying '1980s beautiful woman', 'a child who seems to have traveled in time from the past', and 'it is wonderful to digest 7080 songs'.  The host asked, 'The secret to seeing you can afford to sing a cover song'. She replied,'I sing the interpretation of the song as the main character in a movie and show the movie to the audience.'
 It often appears on KBS 1TV 'Golden Oldies'(). On July 8, 2019, Yun Si-nae's < I am 19 years old> was sung.
 On August 14, 2019, she appeared as a guest with her father, singer Park Si-won(), on the Happy Morning of the Channel A liberal arts program.
 On August 23, 2019, she received a YouTube silver button.
 Appeared on KNN's'Golden Microphone'() in 2019.
 From September 30, 2019, she made her first appearance as an actor in FTV's fishing drama'Seasoning'(), along with Kim Ha-young().
 On November 19, 2019, while recording Kim Jung-ho()'s <White Butterfly>() at KBS Anchi Music() in Cheongju(), she was sneaked into a ghost camera. At the third sound of the ghost, she threw her headphones and fell on the floor and cried.
 Appeared on MBC 'Gayo Best'() on November 28, 2019. As a side note, 'Yoosanseul'() appeared in this episode together. The filming location is in Suncheon City, where Yoyomi is active as an ambassador.
 On December 29, 2019, and January 5, 2020 (the content continues on the 5th), he appeared as a guest on SBS 'Running Man'().
 On March 8 and 15, 2020 MBC Mystery Music Show 'The Masked Singer'() 1st~3rd contest,'Singer King is enough to beat you in 3 minutes!'. She appeared as 'Cup Ramyun'() and went up to the second round. Although she was eliminated in the second round, she sang all three songs prepared at the request of the MC and the judges. For reference, the song she was going to sing in the third round was Cho Yong-pil()'s <The Woman Outside the Window>(). Song Ga-in, who came out as a judge on this day, has already identified her identity from the first round. For reference, Song Ga-in and Yoyomi appeared on the audition program 'Miss Trot tomorrow', even in Group A in the same active duty, and the MC was also Kim Sung-joo. Song Ga-in said, ``There is no such voice in the trot world. It's like a precious treasure.' 'Public Weakling' Lee Yun-seok, who heard <The Woman Outside the Window>, jumped up and cheered as if he had received an ordination prayer.
 From April 28, 2020, OBS's own name is in the'What Songs of Yoyomi'() ('This Songs of Yoyomi'() in 'Unique Entertainment News') Introducing the stories of the singers and singing the representative song as a cover song. Ends October 20.
 On October 8, 2020, she uploaded the cover song for 'Brother Tes'()(Socrates, 470~399 B.C.) by Na Hoon-a() of "Emperor of Trot"() on her YouTube channel. It exceeded ten million views in 10 days. She sang in a distinctive, elegant and sad tone. The public said,"Brother Tes with a completely different feeling" and "I have to call me Brother Tes", and MBN 《News Fighter》 (2020.10.15.) also paid attention to the 'Brother Tes' with another feeling sung by a delicate female singer.
 On October 31, 2020, she appeared in Group B No.27 in MBN's 《Lottery Singer》() in the 5th episode, and sang <The Mistress>() of 'Singer King'() Cho Yong-pil(). On the stage that began with the sound of a bell and a magnificent Gregorian-style chorus, she poured out her sorrow as if she was roaring with her own pure and tender voice.  The beauty in a white dress that reveals the atmosphere like a goddess also drew attention. Jo Jang-hyuk() praised her as "breathing 7, making 3 sounds." Yoyomi said, "I wanted to show the charm of eight colors." She sang Madonna's <Like A Virgin> and Michael Jackson's <Billie Jean> in Group B's re-challenge on November 7. In <Like A Virgin>, she boasted a fresh and bewitching sensuality, and in <Billie Jean>, she showed strong charisma. Park Seong-gwang() praised her, saying, "I love the bright and positive energy. I made good use of the song.".  Park So-hyun() said, "The show-like elements and overwhelming expressions would have shook the hearts of many people. Michael Jackson and Madonna's selections are likely to receive many people's picks."  She was ranked 8th out of 15 in Group B, with outstanding talents.
 Immortal Songs: Singing the Legend() - On November 21, 2020, she selected <Unrequited Love>() by Joo Hyun-mi in the first special episode of KBS 'Trot National Festival'() and took the stage as the last runner.  She pledged to present a happy stage, and started with a soft voice at the beginning and sang a song that felt lovely and happy. After the middle, the tempo was a little faster, and students of the Department of Practical Music and a children's choir participated together. She showed a stage like an exciting festival. Hwang Chi-yeol(singer) said, "She is so cute and small, but she has a lot of great energy on the stage." Song Ga-in() of 'The Goddess of Trot'() said, "She is so cute and her voice is like a jade ball on a silver tray. She has a charm that makes people feel good."  The director Joo Hyun-mi(Legendary singer) said, "It was like a musical. I really wanted to jump to the stage." Announcer Oh Eon-jong() said, "Yoyomi's merits were the most prominent stage. It was like a revival meeting. I naturally raised my hands."  She defeated Shin Yu() of 'Self-luminous emotion-craftsman' who won 3 wins, and finally won.
 On December 4, 2020, a soulful 1.9m singer Kim Tae-woo() appeared on the YouTube broadcast of the mobility music show 《GoStarBuStar》(). This is a project to find the owner of Park Jin-young()'s self-composed song, <Corny Love Song>().” Ten professional and amateur singers invited by JYP(Park Jin-Young) participated.  Yoyomi said, "I wanted to meet Park Jin-young, so I participated. In the first year of high school, I passed the first audition for JYP Entertainment, but my father did not allow me to go for the second one. As soon as I heard the song, I felt like talking about me." She interpreted <Corny Love Song> with her own unique voice, and perfectly expressed sad sensibility, contrary to the usual bright image. Park Jin-young praised her as "Impeccable! I was impressed by your vocalization and sensibility. You didn't mimic any other singers." Yoyomi was the final owner of the <Corny Love Song>.

 On February 10, 2020, on-line music file and music video of <Corny Love Song> were released at 6 pm. It was written, composed, and arranged by Park Jin-young() PD. This project is a song by a singer who does not belong to JYP Entertainment. <Corny Love Song> is the album released as its first song. Trot new singer Yoyomi was selected as a singer after an open audition and was honored as the first guest member. This song was named by Park Jin-young as the genre of 'Con-trot' that combines American country music and Korean trot music. It contains the melody and lyrics of a pure and lyrical sensibility, which is the common point of the two. The accompaniment was recorded only with basic band instruments, and all of the sound equipment completely reproduced the analog sensibility using vacuum tube microphones and preamps used in the 1970s. The music video features Park Jin-young, who transformed into a bandmaster, guitarist and composer, and Yoyomi, an exclusive singer who has a sad love story in 7080's music room <N'est Ci Bon>. The visual beauty of a friendly and cozy atmosphere gives us a special memory trip. This M/V stimulates both fun and sensitivity to the composition of old youth films. Park Jin-young's petty acting and Yoyomi's sensibility through songs are in harmony.  Park Jinyoung completed the content by producing well connected music, visual concept, and M/V story.

Albums

Single, EP 
List of albums:
 2018.02.23. Single 《First Story》 – <Who's that guy>()(Genre:Semi-trot),  <Heart bbong bbong>()(Genre:Semi-trot),  <Man like a magnet>()(Genre:Dance-trot)
 2018.10.16. Single 《Second Story》 – <Alarm of love>()(Genre:Semi-trot)
 2018.11.29. Single 《Third Story》 – <Is it one!>()(Genre:Ballad)
 2018.12.26. Single 《Fourth Story》 – <S-Love>()(Genre:R&B/Soul)
 2019.01.23. Single 《Fifth Story》 – <STEW>()(Genre:Semi-trot)
 2019.02.25. 6th Single – 《Please Don't stop》()(Genre:Indie Rock)
 2019.03.23. 7th Single – 《Please hold me tight》()(Genre:Semi-trot)
 2019.04.27. 8th Single –  《surely》()(Genre:Dance-trot)
 2019.05.30. 9th Single – 《A road in my dream》()(Genre:Semi-trot)
 2019.06.24. 10th Single – 《How much more should I cry》()(Genre:Ballad-trot)
 2019.07.29. 11th Single – 《Attracted》()(Genre:Dance-trot)
 2019.08.29. 12th Single – 《Hong Kong Express》()(Genre:Dance-trot)
 2019.10.31. 13th Single – 《Worried Our Love Will Have Pain》()(Genre:Ballad-trot)
 2019.11.28. 14th Single – 《Vitamin C》()(Genre:Dance)
 2019.12.30. 15th Single – 《If You Love Me》()(Genre:Dance)
 2020.01.27. 16th Single – 《I Wanna Know Your Feeling》()(Genre:Dance)
 2020.02.27. 17th Single – 《Woo Zu Zu》()(Genre:Semi-trot)
 2020.03.30. 18th Single – 《How About Leaving On A UFO》()(Genre:Dance)
 2020.04.30. 19th Single – 《Come Back》()(Genre:Semi-trot)
 2020.05.25. 20th Single – 《Moving On》()(Genre:Dance)
 2020.06.29. 21st Single – 《do or don't》()(Genre:Semi-trot)
 2020.07.30. 22nd Single – 《I always hope you are》()(Genre:Dance)
 2020.08.31. 23rd Single – 《Come see me》()(Genre:Dance-trot)
 2020.09.28. 24th Single – 《Pop! Burst》()(Genre:Dance)
 2020.10.26. 25th Single – 《Just what if》()(Genre:Semi-trot)
 2020.11.30. 26th Single – 《Featured Players》()(Genre:Ballad-trot)
 2020.12.31. 27th Single – 《A little secretly》()(Genre:Dance-trot)
 2021.02.10. Park Jin-young PD's Single – 《Corny Love Song(By Yoyomi)》()(Genre: Cuntry-trot, Lyrics/Composition:Park Jin-young)
 2021.11.15. 28th Single – 《Let's go》()(Genre:Dance-trot, Lyrics:Yoyomi, Composition:Yoyomi/Yeongho Choi)
 2022.05.09. 29th EP – 《Cheers》 〈Cheers(Dream Like Mix)〉, 〈Cheers(Rock Mix)〉()(Genre:Trot, Lyrics: YOYOMI / Yun Noh, Composition:Yun Noh)
 2022.08.08. 30th Single – 《Come On Wolf》()(Genre:Dance-trot, Lyrics/Composition:Jiyu Hong)
 2022.10.03. 31st Single – 《Foolish Man》()(Genre:Trot, Lyrics/Composition:Bumryong Kim)

Original Soundtrack 
 2019.09.23. FTV Drama 《FTV Seasoning OST Part.1》 - <Happily>()
 2019.10.16. FTV Drama 《FTV Seasoning OST Part.3》 - <Happy Virus>()
 2019.12.16. Film 《Right Now This Moment O.S.T》 
 2021.03.28. TV Chosun Drama 《Somehow Family OST Part.7》 - <Life goes like that>()

Compilation 
 2020.05.09. 《Immortal Songs: Singing the Legend - Family Special》 - < I like you> with father
 2020.06.27. 《Immortal Songs: Singing the Legend - Little Star Special》 - <Daybreak Rain>() 
 2020.08.22. 《Immortal Songs: Singing the Legend - Kim Jong-kook X TURBO Part.1》 - <Lovely>()
 2020.11.21. 《Immortal Songs: Singing the Legend - Trot National Festival Special Part.1》 - <Unanswered Love>()

Advertising 
 2019. Single 《Let's save》 - <The salary goes down>() 
 2019. Single 《Let's save - 2th》 - <Eternal Savings>()
 2019. Single 《Let's save - 3rd》 - <You will save>()
 2020. Single 《CATCH ON 2020》 - <CATCH ON Song>()

CM & Logo Songs 
 2019. 《Green Ribbon Environmental Campaign》- <Green Song>()
 2019. KNN LoveFM 《Kim Sang-hyuk Dindin's brother's Radio》 Logo song()
 2019. 《Right Oljeub》 CM song()
 2019. TBS 《Lee Ga-hee's Love Letter》 Logo song()
 2019. Suncheon City PR Song <Let's go to Suncheon>()
 2020. 《Broth Story》 CM song()
 2020. Korea Statistics Office 《2020 Agriculture, Forestry and Fisheries General Survey》 Campaign Song <Only you are the right answer(feat.Uncle)>()
 2020. South Jeolla Province PR Song 《The best province》()

Awards 
 2005. KBS 《Open Children's Song World》 Grand Prize
 2017. 《The 14th Chupungryeong Song Festival》 Encouragement Award
 2018. 《All Together Asia Awards》 Good deed Prize
 2018. 《2018 Green Earth Music Show Awards》 Best Trot Award – Women's Category
 2019. 《2019 World Star Awards》 Trot Category – Popularity Award
 2019. 《27th Korean Cultural Entertainment Awards》 Trot Category – Rookie Award
 2019. 《The 11th Seoul Success Grand Prize》 Culture Category – Rookie Singer Grand Prize
 2020. 《Korean Traditional Music Awards》 Popularity Award
 2020. 《2020 Korea Creator Grand Prize》 Singer Category
 2020. KBS 2TV 《Immortal Songs: Singing the Legend》 EP.482, 'Trot National Festival special feature' Part 1, Final Win
 2020. Youtube 《GoStarBuStar》 'Park Jin-young's <Corny Love Song> Finding the Owner Project', Final Win
 2021. 《7th Korea Culture & Art Star Grand Prize Awards》 Popularity Award
 2021. 《27th Korea Entertainment Arts Awards》 Trot Category - Rookie Award
 2022. 《2022 Global Beauty & Culture Awards》 Music Category - Grand Prize
 2022. 《The 8 Korea Art And Culture Star Awards》 Trot Popularity Award
 2022. 《28th Korea Entertainment Arts Awards》 Netizen Award
 2023. 《The 9 Korea Art And Culture Star Awards》Star Trot Popularity Award

Other activities 
 2018. News Portal 《1004 Club Sharing Community》 Ambassador
 2018. 《Green Ribbon Environment》 Ambassador
 2019. 《Suncheon City》 Honorary Ambassador
 2020. 《Kumyoung Entertainment》 Ambassador 
 2020. 《Enhancing Digital Capabilities》 Ambassador

External links 
 Official Homepage
 YOYOMI Youtube
 YOYOMI POP Youtube

References 

1994 births
Living people
People from Cheongju
21st-century South Korean women singers
Trot singers
Korean singers
South Korean women singer-songwriters